The 1994 Indiana State Sycamores football team represented Indiana State University  as a member of the  Gateway Football Conference during the 1994 NCAA Division I-AA football season. Led by 15th-year coach Dennis Raetz, the Sycamores compiled an overall record of 5–6 with a mark of 2–4 in conference play, placing fifth in the Gateway.

Schedule

References

Indiana State
Indiana State Sycamores football seasons
Indiana State Sycamores football